Saúl Alfonso Hernández Estrada (born January 15, 1964), is a Mexican musician, writer, poet, songwriter and the lead singer of Jaguares and Caifanes, two prominent Mexican rock en español bands.

Biography 

Saúl Hernández was born in the Colonia Guerrero neighborhood of Mexico City on January 15, 1964. He lost his mother at a young age and he explained that this early confrontation with death became an inspiration for many of the songs he has written. His first band was Las Insólitas Imágenes de Aurora, the predecessor to Caifanes.

Caifanes 

After the breakup of Las Insólitas Imágenes de Aurora, the group's demo was widely circulating in the Mexico City music scene.  When Caifanes is formed, the initial lineup was Alfonso André in the drums, Sabo Romo in the bass and Diego Herrera in the keyboard.  Alejandro Marcovich would eventually join the band in the lead guitar. The band made its first appearance on April 11, 1987 in a forum that would catapult new bands, Rockotitlán. The event was a huge success and it marked the beginning of Caifanes.

Jaguares 

José Manuel Aguilera was involved in Jaguares' first studio album;  Cesar "Vampiro" Lopez later took over on lead guitar and has been in the band since.

In 1996, Saúl Hernández sang a duet with Algerian raï singer Khaled. The song, called Ki Kounti, is sung partially in Arabic and Spanish.

Since its formation, Jaguares has been one of "rock en español" (Rock in Spanish) premier bands with both critical and commercial success.

Caifanes returns

Towards the end of 2010, Saúl Hernández reconciled with former Caifane guitarist Alejandro Marcovich and announced their return for the Vive Latino 2011 festival, which marked the reunion of the original band members.

Jaguares returns

On January 14, 2019, it was announced that Jaguares will reunite for a single concert as part of Machaca Fest 2019 in Monterrey, Nuevo Leon.

References 

1964 births
Living people
Mexican musicians
Musicians from Mexico City
Latin Grammy Award winners
Latin music songwriters
Rock songwriters